Lefka Ori (meaning 'White Mountains') or Madares ( from the Cretan Greek   meaning 'without coverage, bald, bare of any vegetation for high mountain areas') is a mountain range located in Western Crete, in the Chania prefecture. The White Mountains or Lefka Ori occupy a large part of the centre of West Crete and are the main feature of the region. They consist mainly of limestone, from light grey to bluish or black color. The White Mountains have taken their name from the perpetual white or off-white color of their peaks as the off white of limestone during the summer and fall interchanges with the snow that covers the peaks until late in spring.

The Lefka Ori also have about 50 gorges, the most famous being the Samaria Gorge.

'tall mountain') and the 10th in Greece.

There are only a few main roads leading into the White Mountains. From the north the roads to Omalos and the entrance of the Samaria Gorge and the road to Chora Sfakion through the plateau of Askifou further to the east. There are other approaches from the west from Sougia and Paleochora leading to Omalos as well as approaches from northeast from Argyroupoli – Asi Ghonia and from Plakias-Frangokastello along the southern coast in the east. There are also a few other minor roads leading to higher elevations.

This is technically called a high desert. It is unique in the northern hemisphere. The prominence of the Lefka Ori range can be seen in the aerial footage below of the Hania province from space [1]:

There are four refuges in Lefka Ori. The Volikas Refuge was built in 1958. It can accommodate up to 30 persons. The Kallergi Refuge was built in 1970. It can accommodate up to 45 persons. The Svourichti Refuge was built in 1994.

The Lefka Ori has a rich history as a hiding place for rebels during Cretan uprisings against the Venetian and Ottoman rulers, as well as during German Occupation (1941–1945).

The Lefka Ori are home to both of Greece's caves with depths greater than one kilometer, Gourgouthakas and the Cave of the Lion.

References

External links
 Greek Mountaineering Club of Chania
  Greek mountain Flora

Mountain ranges of Greece
Mountains of Crete
Landforms of Chania (regional unit)